Carex comans is a plant species in the sedge family, Cyperaceae, endemic to New Zealand. It is used as an ornamental plant, growing in clumps of bluish green leaves with heights of 25–35 centimetres.

References

External links

 The Plant List entry
 Hortipedia entry

comans
Endemic flora of New Zealand
Plants described in 1877
Taxa named by Sven Berggren